Agujaceratops (meaning "horned face from Aguja") is a genus of horned dinosaur from the Late Cretaceous (Campanian) of west Texas. It is a chasmosaurine (long-frilled) ceratopsian. Two species are known, Agujaceratops mariscalensis, and A. mavericus.

Discovery and species

In 1938, three dinosaur bone beds were excavated, and ceratopsian material was collected from Big Bend National Park (Texas) by William Strain. This material was studied by Lehman in 1989 and named Chasmosaurus mariscalensis. It is known only from the holotype UTEP P.37.7.086 a partial adult skull which includes a braincase, left supraorbital horncore, left maxilla and a right dentary. Additional material was associated with the holotype, but not considered to be part of it. All specimens of Agujaceratops were collected from the lower part of the Upper Shale member of the Aguja Formation, dating to about 77 million years ago, in the Big Bend National Park, Brewster County. Additional material was recovered from elsewhere in west Texas, including a nearly complete skull from Rattlesnake Mountain desginated TMM 43098-1.

Originally described as Chasmosaurus mariscalensis by Lehman in 1989, subsequent analysis resulted in the taxon being put in its own genus. Agujaceratops was named by Spencer G. Lucas, Robert M. Sullivan and Adrian Hunt in 2006, and the type species is Agujaceratops mariscalensis.

Later, Lehman and colleagues revisited the Agujaceratops material and found substantial variation. They described the Rattlesnake Mountain skull as a new species, Agujaceratops mavericus.

Description

It was similar to other chasmosaurines such as Pentaceratops in having a short nose horn, long brow horns, and an elongate frill circled by small hornlets. The back of the frill has a strong notch, as in Pentaceratops and Chasmosaurus, giving it a heart shape, with three or four pairs of spike-like hornlets. The edges of the frill bear numerous low, blunt hornlets, giving it a strongly scalloped appearance. The brow horns are oriented up and out, and curve backwards in side view.

Two species are known, Agujaceratops mariscalensis and A. mavericus. A. mariscalensis has shorter brow horns and a shorter frill.

Ecology
Like other ceratopsids, Agujaceratops was a four-legged plant eater. The elaborate frill and horns suggest a complex social life, perhaps involving displays towards and fights with other members of the species over territory or mating. Multiple individuals are found in a single quarry. It is unclear whether this represents animals brought together by a drought or flood event, or perhaps a herd. Although it is common to find multiple individuals of centrosaurine ceratopsids together - large bonebeds are known for Centrosaurus and Pachyrhinosaurus, for example - bonebeds are rarer for chasmosaurines.

At the time, the Aguja Formation lay along the western margin of the Western Interior Seaway. The habitat Agujaceratops lived in (at least where the fossil material was found) may have been a swamp, due to the nature of the sediments.

Agujaceratops lived alongside a fauna that included the feathered dinosaur Leptorhynchos gaddisi and the small pachycephalosaur Texacephale. Predators would have included tyrannosaurs and the giant crocodilian Deinosuchus riograndensis.

See also
 Timeline of ceratopsian research
 2016 in paleontology

References

External links
 DinoGeorge's List of Dinosaurs, including Agujaceratops
 Brief mention of Agujaceratops on the DML  and here as well 
 Texas archosaurs, including Chasmosaurus (now Agujaceratops)

Chasmosaurines
Late Cretaceous dinosaurs of North America
Fossil taxa described in 2006
Taxa named by Spencer G. Lucas
Paleontology in Texas
Campanian genus first appearances
Campanian genus extinctions
Ornithischian genera